Pomaire is a Chilean town in the commune of Melipilla in Melipilla Province, Santiago Metropolitan Region. Abundant natural clay in the hills surrounding the town bolstered a thriving pottery industry in the community.

In the village there is a tradition of giving Chanchitos, little pig statuettes to friends and family members to bring good luck.

See also
 List of towns in Chile

References

http://www.southamerica.cl/Chile/Pomaire.htm

Populated places in Melipilla Province